Villamayor de Gállego is a municipality located in the province of Zaragoza, Aragon, Spain. According to the 2010 census (INE), the municipality has a population of 2,888 inhabitants.  Villamayor de Gállego became independent from Zaragoza in 2006.

References

External links

www.villamayordegallego.com Villamayor de Gállego Official Website

Municipalities in the Province of Zaragoza